This article presents the discography of Jocelyn Enriquez.

Studio albums

Singles

 1 BB Swing featuring Jocelyn Enriquez.
 2 As part of the trio Stars on 54.
 3 Thunderpuss featuring Jocelyn Enriquez.

References

Discographies of American artists